Gaute Hallan Steiwer  (born 31 January 1990) is a Norwegian orienteering competitor. He was born in Oslo.

He won gold medals in the middle distance and in the relay at the 2010 Junior World Orienteering Championships in Aalborg.

He won a gold medal in the relay at the 2018 World Orienteering Championships in Latvia, together with Eskil Kinneberg and Magne Dæhli. Steiwer was running the first leg of the relay, and came second to the first change-over, 18 seconds behind then leading Latvia.

He is a younger brother of Kine Hallan Steiwer.

References

Norwegian orienteers
Male orienteers
1990 births
Living people
Sportspeople from Oslo
21st-century Norwegian people
Junior World Orienteering Championships medalists